Filippo Baldassari (born 22 July 1988, Chiaravalle, Ancona) is an Italian sailor. He competed at the 2012 Summer Olympics in the Men's Finn class.

References

External links
 
 
 

1988 births
Living people
Italian male sailors (sport)
Olympic sailors of Italy
Sailors at the 2012 Summer Olympics – Finn
Sportspeople from Ancona